The 1969–70 St. Louis Blues season involved finishing in first place in the West Division for the second consecutive season. The Blues were the only team in the West Division with a winning record, as they finished 22 points ahead of the second-placed Pittsburgh Penguins. The Blues matched their previous season's total of 37 wins, but finished with 86 points, two points shy of the previous season's points total. NHL legend Camille Henry played his final game with the St. Louis Blues. Henry got 3 points in 4 games.

From a goaltending standpoint, the franchise experienced many changes. Glenn Hall had retired at the end of the 1968–69 season but returned. Despite an appearance in the All-Star Game, Jacques Plante played his final season in St. Louis. He was sold by the Blues to the Toronto Maple Leafs for cash on May 18, 1970. Ernie Wakely was acquired from the defending Stanley Cup champion Montreal Canadiens and became the Blues starting goaltender for the following season.

In the playoffs, St. Louis defeated the Minnesota North Stars 4–2 and the Pittsburgh Penguins 4–2 to advance to their third consecutive Stanley Cup final, where they were swept by the Boston Bruins. Phil Goyette became the first Lady Byng Trophy winner in franchise history as he led the team with 78 points. This would also mark the last time the Blues would make the finals until 2019, where they again face the Bruins, and captured their first Stanley Cup in seven games.

Offseason

NHL draft
Tommi Salmelainen was the first European drafted by an NHL franchise.

Regular season

Glenn Hall
As he did with the Chicago Black Hawks in 1966, Glenn Hall retired from St. Louis at the end of the 1968–69 season. He was talked into returning, usually with a promise of more money, but he didn't profess to enjoy his livelihood. Although Hall stayed in St. Louis, he still got nauseous before each game as he did earlier in his career.

Ernie Wakely
Ernie Wakely played two games for the Montreal Canadiens from 1962 to 1969. On June 27, 1969, Wakely got his big break when the Canadiens dealt the 28-year-old to the St. Louis Blues for Norm Beaudin and Bobby Schmautz. The 1969–70 season was a career season for Wakely. He appeared in 30 games for St. Louis, registering a 2.11 GAA and four shutouts.

Wakely had to take over from the legendary Glenn Hall. Wakely made the most of his opportunity as he helped lead the Blues to the Stanley Cup finals. The Blues were defeated in four straight games by Bobby Orr's Boston Bruins.

Final standings

Schedule and results

Playoffs

West Division semi-finals
In the West Division playoffs, the St. Louis Blues ousted the Minnesota North Stars in six games. The Blues won the first two games at the St. Louis Arena. Game three at the Metropolitan Sports Center featured Gump Worsley's sharp goaltending and Bill Goldsworthy scoring two goals in a 4–2 win for the North Stars. Cesare Maniago played in goal for Minnesota in game four and picked up a 4–0 shutout, tying the series. Game five at St. Louis Arena was tied 3–3 when St Louis scored three goals in the third period by Red Berenson, Terry Gray and Jim Roberts, and the Blues won 6–3. In game six, Ab McDonald scored two goals as the Blues eliminated the North Stars by a score of 4–2.

West Division finals

Stanley Cup Finals

Boston Bruins vs. St. Louis Blues

For the third consecutive year, the Blues were swept in the Stanley Cup finals. This time, they faced the Boston Bruins, who, with stars like Bobby Orr and Phil Esposito, were more than a match for them. The first three games were not close. The Blues managed to force overtime in game four, but Orr scored his famous game-winning goal to end the series.

Player statistics

Regular season
Scoring

Goaltending

Playoffs
Scoring

Goaltending

Awards and records
 Clarence S. Campbell Bowl
 Lady Byng Memorial Trophy: || Phil Goyette
 Jacques Plante, goaltender, NHL All-Star Game

Farm teams

References

 
 Blues on Hockey Database

St. Louis Blues seasons
St. Louis
St. Louis
St Louis
St Louis